Savar Model College is a higher secondary educational institution located in Savar Upazila, near Dhaka, Bangladesh established in January 1996.

References

External links
 

High schools in Bangladesh
1996 establishments in Bangladesh
Organisations based in Savar
Universities and colleges in Savar
Education in Savar